The 1939 WANFL season was the 55th season of the various incarnations of the Western Australian National Football League. It is best known for West Perth's record losing streak of twenty-seven matches up to the fifteenth round, an ignominy equalled by Peel Thunder in their formative years but never actually beaten. The Cardinals finished with the worst record since Midland Junction lost all twelve games in 1917, and were the first WANFL team with only one victory for twelve seasons. In their only win, champion forward Ted Tyson became the first West Australian to kick over one thousand goals and he just failed to replicate his 1938 feat of leading the goalkicking for a bottom club. Subiaco, despite a second Sandover win from Haydn Bunton (in spite of several problematic leg injuries) won only three matches, and Swan Districts, affected by the loss of star goalkicker Ted Holdsworth to Kalgoorlie, began a long period as a cellar-dweller with a fall to sixth.

Claremont, with captain George Moloney returning to the goalfront from the centre, won their second consecutive premiership despite the loss of many key players in the week before the Grand Final, whilst East Fremantle and East Perth remained firmly entrenched in the top and had a neck-and-neck battle late in the season for the double chance. Perth and South Fremantle, both of whom had had long periods in the wilderness, fought an exciting battle for the last place in the top four that ended with the red and whites winning by the narrowest of margins, in the process providing a basis for the club's dynasty following World War II, which began on the weekend of the penultimate round.

Two key rule changes were made in the WANFL and nationally in 1939. The holding the ball rule was altered to eliminate the provision for a player to drop the ball when tackled, meaning that a player was forced to either kick or handpass the ball when tackled to avoid conceding a free kick; and, the boundary throw-in was reintroduced whenever the ball went out of bounds, except when put out deliberately, instead of a free kick being awarded against the last player to touch the ball, as had been the case since 1925.

Home-and-away season

Round 1

Round 2 (Labour Day)

Round 3

Round 4

Round 5

Round 6

Round 7

Round 8

Round 9

Round 10 (Foundation Day)

Round 11

Round 12

Round 13

Round 14

Round 15

Round 16

Round 17

Round 18

Round 19

Round 20

Ladder

Finals

First semi-final

Second semi-final

Preliminary final

Grand final

References

External links
Official WAFL website
Western Australian National Football League (WANFL), 1939

WANFL
West Australian Football League seasons